Luke Dillon may refer to:
Luke Dillon, 4th Baron Clonbrock (1834–1917), Irish peer
Luke Dillon, former Fair City character
Luke C. Dillon (1844?–1904), US photographer

See also
Lucas Dillon (disambiguation), multiple people